A Poor Wife's Devotion is a 1909 American silent film produced by Kalem Company and directed by Sidney Olcott, shot in Florida.

Production notes
The film was shot in Jacksonville, Florida.

Bibliography

 The Moving Picture World, Vol 4 n°, p 723.
 The New York Dramatic Mirror, May 6, 1909, p 15.

External links

 A Poor Wife's Devotion website dedicated to Sidney Olcott

1909 films
1909 drama films
1909 short films
American black-and-white films
American silent short films
Films directed by Sidney Olcott
Films set in Florida
Films shot in Jacksonville, Florida
Silent American drama films
1900s American films